Path 27, also called the Intermountain or the Southern Transmission System (STS), is a high-voltage direct current (HVDC) electrical transmission line running from the coal-fired Intermountain Power Plant near Delta, Utah to the Adelanto Converter Station  at Adelanto, California, in the Southwestern United States. It was installed by the ABB Group, a company based in Switzerland, and commercialized in July 1986. The system is designed to carry power generated at the power plant in Utah to areas throughout Southern California. It is owned and operated by the Intermountain Power Agency, a cooperative consisting of six Los Angeles-area cities, the largest member being the Los Angeles Department of Water and Power (LADWP), and 29 smaller Utah municipalities.

The resulting maximum current is 4,800 amperes. Given its length, a direct current (DC) is preferred to the more common alternating current (AC) as it allows the electrical energy to travel farther with minimal loss to resistance and requires no intermediate stations. It is bipolar, meaning that it has two conductors of opposite polarity (in place of three conductors for AC lines). Both conductors for the entire length are three cables bundled together; this is done to reduce the effects of EM interference and enhance conductance. At each end of the line is a converter station that changes AC to DC on one side and back again on the other. Each terminus also features a dedicated ground which is connected by an electrode line to a grounding site away from the converters to provide ample earth return; this helps protect the main line and equipment from faults, and allows the system to operate at partial capacity.

Sections of Path 27 are paralleled by many other AC transmission lines, including some of 500 kV. The line is also viewable from Interstate 15 which it crosses several times on its trek.

Overview

Background 

High voltages are typically needed to convey large quantities of electrical power over a vast distance, while also minimizing the amount of energy lost to resistance in the conductive cables as a byproduct from a high current; that is, raising the voltage lowers the amperage for the circuit, according to Ohm's law. Whereas high-voltage transmission routes commonly use a three-phase alternating current (AC) to move electricity in a to-and-fro fashion, high-voltage direct current (HVDC) lines, such as Path 27, carry power in only one direction. A direct current (DC) also incurs less loss of energy than AC over the same distance; in other words, DC can sustain power much further than AC, which may require intermediate stations, or "taps," along the route. Another disadvantage for AC is that power tends to flow on the outer layer of the conductor, a phenomenon called the "skin effect." DC eschews this problem; it allows power to penetrate the entire thickness of the conductor for optimal capacity. Finally, DC circuitry has been chosen for Path 27 because the cost of transmitting power over its distance is lower than with AC, which is best economically suited for shorter stretches. HVDC is also cheaper because it utilizes fewer than three conductors, translating to less materials and subsequently allaying the cost of infrastructure and equipment used.

ABB Group, a multinational electrical supplier based in Switzerland, manages the framework and supplies for Path 27, and was a chief contributor for the power line's installment. The number in "Path 27" is assigned by the Western Electricity Coordinating Council (WECC), which oversees the electrical transmission grid across the American West, to distinguish this line from the other critical transmission routes.

Path 27 is owned and operated by an inter-municipal cooperative known as the Intermountain Power Agency (IPA), thus lending it the alternative name Intermountain. The IPA's roster includes 29 Utah municipalities—amidst them two suburbs of Salt Lake City, and Logan as the northernmost participant—and six Southern California cities. The cooperative was founded around this mission:
Among its objectives is funneling excess energy to communities in Southern California; Path 27 was built to fulfill that purpose. The topmost SoCal client by population on the list is the Los Angeles Department of Water and Power (LADWP), the preeminent utility provider for Los Angeles, which also receives the greatest share of power through the plan ahead of Anaheim, Riverside, Pasadena, Burbank, and Glendale (as shown in the table below). Altogether, these members acquire the biggest proportion of energy under the IPA.

History 
The earliest concept of Path 27 likely originated in 1973, coinciding with an energy crisis of that decade plaguing the U.S. During that year, after the U.S. Bureau of Reclamation warned of a forthcoming energy shortage, representatives for the Utah-based Intermountain Consumer Power Association (ICPA) convened with Southern California localities in a quest for newer power sources and for investors. The IPA established in June 1977.

A crucial step for Path 27 came with the Intermountain Power Project (IPP), which emerged in 1974 as a program for financing the construction of a coal-fired generator, though it was not until 1977 that Utah's legislatures formally endorsed IPA's implementation of the project. Caineville in Wayne County, UT, was one of several locations suggested for the power plant, prior to settling upon the site north of Delta in Millard County, or west of Lynndyl as stated in the sanction. After clearing environmental checks, the generator broke ground on October 9, 1981, with $300 million in initial funds. The original plan called for four thermal units, 750 MW aside, but it had decreased to two due to concerns over precipitous power demand. The generator's first unit was erected in 1983. The first batch of coal was delivered by train on July 2, 1985, and the first unit came online later that year. The second unit was actuated on June 13, 1987, bringing the plant to its fullest capacity of 1,500 MW. It would be bolstered to its present-day 1,900-MW productivity in 1989, hence rendering the electrical generator the largest in Utah by yield.

However, Path 27 fully materialized when the transmission line's construction commenced on May 1, 1984, and took slightly more than sixteen months to complete. Various American contractors were commissioned for certain aspects and segments of the line; for instance, one entity from Georgia built  worth from Adelanto, California to Moapa, Nevada, and another from Mississippi took on the remaining  till Delta; but perhaps the most notable obligation for this turnkey project rested upon ABB Group, who imported the conductive cables and pieces for the steel-lattice support pylons to be assembled on the spot. Newspapers reported that rocky, jagged terrain often posed challenges for accessibility and had likely necessitated copious excavation and even dynamiting. In all, six hundred workers were deployed for the labor. The line achieved revenue service in July 1986 after the ignition of the power plant's first coal-burning unit, even though a document by LADWP attests that it might have been energized as early as December 1985. Depending on official tallies and news accounts, the total cost was $5.5 billion.

Finally yet equally integral for Path 27 are two converter stations (see below), which were inaugurated along with the transmission main, and are vital for its functionality. IPP's converter was installed in conjunction with the power generator, while the second converter in Adelanto and a tangent switchyard began rising on May 26, 1985, and finished in June 1986 in time to receive freshly-borne energy from borders over. LADWP supervised the construction of the combined facility and tasked ABB Group with the responsibility of the accouterments.

Later history 
Since its inception, Path 27 saw upgrades and refinements around the latter turn of the century—the IPP's latest proliferation included. At the behest of LADWP and Southern California Edison, ABB Group and Hitachi Energy modernized the transmission line in 2008 and 2011, respectively, with improved control and protection technology alongside supplemental filters and cooling systems at each terminal. This helped raise the power line's capacity to its modern-day level of 2,400 MW.

Installation

Transmission 
The primary component of Path 27 is the transmission line itself, which travels a length of  entirely aboveground through southwestern Utah, southern Nevada, and southern California. It exerts ±500 kV and is rated for 2,400 MW, giving it a maximum current rating of 4,800 amperes; by comparison, the Intermountain Power Plant (IPP) generates up to 1,900 MW, thus adding to the line's fault tolerance. As opposed to three phases, Path 27 has two poles; one positive (cathode) and another negative (anode); making this a bipolar configuration. On most HVDC systems, power can be sent in either direction; Path 27 transports electricity from Utah to California under normal circumstances.

Any conductive material engenders electromagnetic radiation whenever electricity flows through it. A single cable carrying such high voltage would produce particularly strong radiation in the form of a corona discharge that can deprive electrical energy and cause EM interference on radio and communication devices. For this reason, Path 27's conductors comprise three cables fastened together, or are triple-bundled. This not only reduces the detrimental effects of discharge, it also provides more surface area for power to flow, thereby improving transmission efficiency.

Two shield wires are mounted above the main conductors and shared by the same support pylons. These wires guard the power line against lightning strikes.

Converters 

Both sides of Path 27 feature a converter station, which bridges electrical power between AC and DC circuitry and is ubiquitous to HVDC projects worldwide. The converters are located at the IPP station north of Delta, UT, and the Adelanto Converter Station in Adelanto, north of San Bernardino, CA. 

The heart of the conversion process transpires in clusters of electronic valves that procedurally modify the flow of electricity in a manner similar to switches. The type of valves on Path 27 is thyristor, technology popular in HVDC since the late 1960s. As a matter of redundancy, the valves at both terminals are grouped two by six; should one be disabled, the other can pick up the slack above its designated capacity for a limited duration. The entire assemblage is housed in a hangar-like enclosure called a valve hall that protects it from the weather and airborne dust. The valves are affixed on tall insulators that separate them from the interior walls, floor, and ceiling; done to hinder induction and premature grounding, as well as aid cooling. Path 27's valve halls are also fortified against earthquakes. 

As the IPP converter is adjacent to the power plant, electricity is generally fed into the HVDC line from this terminus. Ingress for power to the system is preceded by a row of transformers that step up the voltage level to 500 . Next, it infiltrates the valve hall through enormous bushings that protect the building from damage caused by arcing. Inside the hall, the valves pipe the electrical flow from AC to DC in a complex process called rectification. On the DC circuitry back outside sits a sequence of filters and reactors that reciprocally serve to cushion the facility from disturbances as a result of power surges. The electricity is then sent on its way down Path 27. 

The Adelanto Converter Station demarks the receiving end of the HVDC line and has relatively the same layout, but the conversion mechanism is reversed. Beyond another set of reactors and filters, the inpouring power enters the valve hall to be carried over to AC circuitry anew—this is inversion, and it blocks vagrant power on the AC conduit from reaching the valves to enforce unidirectional movement. The electricity advances through a second tier of transformers before disemboguing onto diverging AC lines to be dispersed across the vicinity. 

Ideally, Path 27 can work in the opposite direction, with the Adelanto terminal becoming a rectifier, and the IPP an inverter, although this seldom happens out of practicality.

Grounding system 

Like any HVDC scheme, Path 27 needs to be grounded at both ends in order to operate with respect to the earth. Grounding provides the electrical current a common path back into the earth, which serves as a neutral point for the circuit. 

Even with safeguards and a substantive fault tolerance, failures on the line can and do occur, thence grounding becomes a workaround for continued reliability of the system. If one pole develops a fault, its current is diverted via the ground return to complete the circuit. This de-energizes the problem conductor, while the second pole remains active; in technical terms, grounding allows the power line to function as a monopole instead of a bipole. However, it halves the line's overall capacity. A pole may also be taken offline by the same means for maintenance, ensuring the safety of work crews. This contingency precludes the need to shut down the whole HVDC system and interrupt the power source, yet it is temporary, as the earth return on a bipolar system is not intended for prolonged use.

HVDC exhibits significant potential such that the converter's onsite grounding devices are not enough to withstand alone, and a return current would otherwise cause issues at the electrical facility including rapid metal corrosion, so the grounding nodes are set at remote locations. These spots were chosen in part for high conductivity within the earthen minerals.

At each grounding point is an array of buried conductive rods that form an electrode, marking the actual transition into the earth for the current. The rods are individually encased in a perforated-metal tube, or a "well," to retard corrosion. The wells are filled with petroleum coke to enhance the current's connectivity into the soil. Additionally, the coke regulates heat that the rod naturally emits when a current is induced; this is to mitigate the electrode's impact on the surrounding environment. A series of jumper cables radiating from the center of the circle feed the return current into the rods. At the center on the surface perches a small structure called a terminal house, which is also equipped with a transmitter that helps technicians monitor the electrode's performance. The "deep-well" setup of Path 27's electrodes is a variation of the "ring-style" electrode found on other HVDC projects such as the Nelson River Transmission System in Canada.

These are the electrode lines, arteries for the return current—more precisely, the electrode line carries the current to the terminal house which then injects it through the electrode. Starting at both termini, the electrode line runs atop Path 27's main pylons in lieu of shield wires before branching off along a standalone set of steel utility poles. Steel poles have been selected for their resiliency in the hot, arid locales. Uniquely, Adelanto's electrode line travels underground for its final  approximately till the grounding site.

The electrodes and electrode lines are distinct from the neutral wire, which would involve an extra third conductor along the span of Path 27—the former HVDC Vancouver Island being an example. Such method would likely be infeasible for its scope and magnitude.

Route

Following the regular power flow, Path 27 begins at the Intermountain Power Plant in Utah and heads briefly west before curving southward, passing over the U.S. 50/U.S. 6 duplex west of Hinkley.

Inside Nevada, Path 27 traverses the Mormon Mesa, bypassing Glendale and crossing the Muddy River. It bisects the Moapa River Indigenous Reservation lands before crossing Interstate 15 near Crystal. Across Las Vegas Valley, the line meets with NV 564 while riding through the Frenchman Mountain, straddles the River Mountains bypassing Henderson, and crosses Interstate 11 at Railroad Pass before heading into Eldorado Valley. Upon traversing the McCullough Range, it descends into Ivanpah Valley, missing Primm in its north and crossing Interstate 15 again; shortly thereafter, it enters California.

Path 27 cuts across isolated, oft-rugged tracts of the High Desert while also encountering CA 127 north of Baker. Now in the Inland Empire, the line proceeds through Victor Valley where it crosses Interstate 15 once more near Yermo, as well as old U.S. 66 and Interstate 40 between Daggett and Newberry Springs. It then encounters CA 247 south of Barstow. Around Bell Mountain, Path 27 meets with Interstate 15 one last time, and then old U.S. 66 a second instance and U.S. 395 near Oro Grande before reaching Adelanto, where the line arrives at its final destination of the Adelanto Converter Station.

Numerous AC transmission lines parallel Path 27 throughout its course. A 345-kV circuit runs beside the DC line interlinking the IPP and a wind farm near Milford. A second 345-kV circuit leading to the Harry Allen Generating Station joins Path 27 near Cedar City. North of Mesquite, both are joined by a 500-kV line connecting the decommissioned Navajo Generating Station; the three travel somewhat within eyeshot of Interstate 15 until a solar park near Crystal. An assortment of 500-kV transmission corridors then follow Path 27 through Las Vegas Valley toward another collection of solar farms outside Boulder City. From Ivanpah Valley onward, two more 500-kV circuits and a third of 287 kV accompany Path 27 across the desert—these three constitute WECC Path 46. By Victorville, Path 27 splits from the three AC routes but is once again shadowed by others of various voltages before culminating in Adelanto. Stringing multiple circuits on the same right-of-way is not unusual, as it consumes less land per mile.

Future 

The coal-firing powerhouses at the  site are to be retired by 2027; this adheres to LADWP's wishes for reducing its dependence on fossil fuels in favor of greener energy. The plant will be replaced with a gas-powered facility specially tailored for harvesting hydrogen by 2025, and paired with a solar farm on a nearby parcel. The sources will beget 840 MW and 300 MW at peak, respectively, or 1,140 MW when combined, still lower than Path 27's maximal capacity. Neither is anticipated to alter the power line's structure.

References

Notes

Citations

External links

 Map of Path 27's course, including overhead electrode lines, locations of converters and grounding points, Google Maps
  Intermountain HVDC transmission system, The ABB Group 
 https://web.archive.org/web/20050526185217/http://www.transmission.bpa.gov/cigresc14/Compendium/IPP.htm
 https://web.archive.org/web/20050426153127/http://www.transmission.bpa.gov/cigresc14/Compendium/Ipp+Pictures.pdf

See also 

 Pacific DC Intertie - a similar HVDC system running through the Western U.S.
 List of HVDC projects

Western Interconnection
Energy infrastructure in California
Energy infrastructure in Nevada
Energy infrastructure in Utah
HVDC transmission lines